Special elections to the California State Assembly are called by the Governor of California when a vacancy arises within the State Assembly. Most special elections are conducted in two rounds. The first is an open primary and the candidate with the most votes must have a majority of the votes plus one to win the seat. If no candidate wins a majority a second round is held with the two top candidates regardless of party.

Recall elections, the process by which voters petition for the removal of an elected official, are also included.

List of special elections
The dates listed only include the open primary round if no second round was held.

List of recall elections 
When applicable, the candidate who succeeded the recalled state assemblymember is listed. If the recall election was not successful the winner is listed as "none".

Results

80th district special election, 2013

52nd district special election, 2013

45th district special election, 2013

54th district special election, 2013

31st district special election, 2016

51st district special election, 2017

54th district special election, 2018

39th district special election, 2018

45th district special election, 2018

1st district special election, 2019

79th district special election, 2021

54th district special election, 2021

18th district special election, 2021

49th district special election, 2022

17th district special election, 2022

11th district special election, 2022

62nd district special election, 2022

80th district special election, 2022

References 

Special elections
California State Assembly, special elections
Special elections to the California State Assembly
California State Assembly